Gopal Chandra Kundu (born 1959) is an renowned Indian cell and cancer biologist and a Senior Scientist (Scientist-G) at National Centre for Cell Science. He is known for his contributions towards the understanding the mechanism of cancer progression in breast, melanoma and other cancers and development of novel therapeutic targets and target-based therapy in cancers.

An elected fellow of the Indian Academy of Sciences and the National Academy of Sciences, India, he received the National Bioscience Award for Career Development of the Department of Biotechnology in 2003. The Council of Scientific and Industrial Research, the apex agency of the Government of India for scientific research, awarded him the Shanti Swarup Bhatnagar Prize for Science and Technology, one of the highest Indian science awards, in 2004, for his contributions to biological sciences.

Education and career 
Kundu obtained his Ph.D. from Bose Institute, Kolkata, India (1989) in protein biochemistry and did his post-doctoral research work at the Cleveland Clinic Foundation, University of Colorado, University of Wyoming, and the National Institutes of Health from 1989 to 1998. He has performed work in the area of cardiovascular biology, inflammation and immunomodulation during that period. In 1998, he joined as Scientist-D at the National Centre for Cell Science (NCCS), Pune. At present, he is working as Scientist-G at NCCS. His area of research at NCCS is tumor biology, regulation of gene expression, cell signaling, angiogenesis, cancer therapeutics, biomarker studies for cancer detection, and nanomedicine.

He is Fellow of The National Academy of Sciences, India, and Indian Academy of Sciences. He is member of American Society for Biochemistry and Molecular Biology and New York Academy of Sciences.
He has published 70 papers in peer reviewed international journals.

He serves as Editorial Board Member of Current Molecular Medicine, Molecular Medicine Reports, The Open Cancer Journal and American Journal of Cancer Research.

Awards
In 2004 Kundu was awarded a Shanti Swarup Bhatnagar Prize for Science and Technology, following the receipt of an earlier National Bioscience Award for Career Development in 2003.
International Journal of Oncology, Oncology Reports and International Journal of Molecular Medicine Award for an outstanding achievement in Oncology, Greece; International Young Investigator Award, USA. 7th National Grassroots Innovation Award-2013, Rashtrapati Bhavan, New Delhi.

Controversy
A controversy erupted in the NCCS in 2006 when an anonymous mail alleged that Kundu and others might have misrepresented data in a paper published in the Journal of Biological Chemistry. The allegation was that they had rehashed the same set of data which they had published earlier. An internal committee of the NCCS advised the authors to take back their paper, however an independent committee led by G. Padmanabhan, a former director of Indian Institute of Science, Bangalore, concluded that there was no manipulation in the data. On 23 February 2007, the Journal of Biological Chemistry withdrew the paper amid allegations of data manipulation, although the authors maintained that the two papers used different set of data though similar experiments.

Selected publications

See also
 Scientific plagiarism in India

References

Indian medical researchers
People involved in plagiarism controversies
1959 births
Living people
Scientists from Kolkata
Indian cell biologists
Fellows of the Indian Academy of Sciences
Fellows of The National Academy of Sciences, India
Recipients of the Shanti Swarup Bhatnagar Award in Biological Science
N-BIOS Prize recipients